SERI may stand for:

Samsung Economic Research Institute, a prominent private-sector think tank in South Korea established by Samsung.
State Secretariat for Education, Research and Innovation, a government body under the Federal Department of Home Affairs of Switzerland.